Sandugo (International title: Fists of Fate / ) is a 2019 Philippine drama action television series starring Ejay Falcon and Aljur Abrenica. The series was aired on ABS-CBN's Kapamilya Gold afternoon block and worldwide via The Filipino Channel from September 30, 2019 to March 20, 2020, replacing Precious Hearts Romances Presents: Los Bastardos.

Premise
Sandugo is the story of two brothers who grew up separately and ended up on opposing sides. JC and Aris are fraternal twins who did things together as kids. But while Aris is a strong and athletic boy, JC is suffering from a congenital heart ailment and is in dire need of an operation. Their parents tried their best to earn money for the treatment, but JC's time is running out. In an act of desperation, their mother gives up Aris for adoption, receiving a hefty sum in return. Soon, JC and Leo will face each other from opposing sides of the law not knowing they are brothers. Will they wage war against each other or will their hearts remember that they are brothers of one blood?

Cast and characters

Main
 Ejay Falcon as Julius Caesar "JC" Reyes
 Aljur Abrenica as Aristotle "Aris" Reyes / Leo Balthazar
 Elisse Joson as Grace Policarpio- Reyes
 Jessy Mendiola as Melissa "Melai" Pamintuan
 Cherry Pie Picache as Joan Reyes
 Vina Morales as Cordelia Nolasco-Balthazar
 Ariel Rivera as PC/MSgt. Eugene Reyes
 Gardo Versoza as PO1 Ulysses Balthazar / Señor De Niro

Supporting
 Arlene Muhlach as  Marilou "Lulu" Policarpio
 Ogie Diaz as Hugoberto "Hugo" Martinez
 TJ Valderrama as Tunying
 Jeric Raval as Flavio Villanueva
 Mark Lapid as Darius Guerrero
 Nanding Josef as Fr.Winston Tagle
 Dido dela Paz as Silver Angeles
 Kiko Matos as Adolfo Salazar
 Maika Rivera as Inez Fajardo / Karen Guerrero
 Aljon Mendoza as Marco Policarpio
 Karina Bautista as Andrea "Andeng" Kalaw
 Reign Parani as Gwen Balthazar
 Ali Abinal as Napoleon "Nap" Bata
 Michael Roy Jornales as Rocco
 Cogie Domingo as Alfie
 Ali Khatibi as Marc
 Garie Concepcion as Ditas

Guests
 Mike Magat as Dante
 Luke Alford as young Adolfo
 Angelica Rama as young Grace
 Zyren dela Cruz as young JC
 Marc Santiago as young Aris/Leo
 Apey Obera as Faye
 Benj Manalo as Bernardo
 Matmat Centino as Rosa
 Jan Urbano as Roman
 Chienna Filomeno as Ella
 Aurora Yumul as Baring
 Angela Tinimbang as Tarcing
 Nats Sitoy as Ofie
 William Lorenzo as Nestor

Production

Casting
Aiko Melendez was originally cast for the role of Cordelia, but later backs out to focus on supporting then-Mayor Jay Khonghun's bid for Vice Governor of Zambales. Melendez was replaced by Vina Morales.

Finale broadcast
Sandugo continued to air through its finale week despite the enhanced community quarantine in Luzon already lingering due to the COVID-19 pandemic in the Philippines.

Originally set to be replaced by Ang sa Iyo ay Akin, the aforementioned show's premiere was postponed due to the suspension of tapings. Its timeslot was later filled by reruns of Got to Believe from March 23, 2020 until the network's free-to-air closure.

Timeslot block
This is the last series that airs at 4:30 PM every afternoon in last 2020.

Reruns
The show began airing re-runs since March 6, 2023 on ALLTV.

Reception

See also
 List of programs broadcast by ABS-CBN
 List of ABS-CBN drama series

References

External links
 
 

ABS-CBN drama series
Philippine action television series
Philippine drama television series
Filipino-language television shows
Television shows filmed in the Philippines
2019 Philippine television series debuts
2020 Philippine television series endings